Jiří Kowalík (born 5 September 1977) is a Czech former professional footballer who played as a striker. He is notable for being the top scorer of the Gambrinus liga in 2002–03, scoring 16 goals for 1. FC Synot.

Kowalík's career at the top was ended when, in 2004, he tore knee ligaments while at Brno.

After some time in Slovakia, Kowalík returned to the Czech Republic in 2008 to play for FK Mutěnice in the Moravian–Silesian Football League. In 2009, he was playing lower league football at Kněžpole in the Uherské Hradiště District.

References

External links 
 Profile at iDNES.cz

1977 births
Living people
Association football forwards
Czech footballers
Czech First League players
1. FC Slovácko players
FK Teplice players
FC Zbrojovka Brno players
People from Frýdek-Místek
Sportspeople from the Moravian-Silesian Region